Nkore (also called Nkole, Nyankore, Nyankole, Orunyankore, Orunyankole, Runyankore and Runyankole) is a Bantu language spoken by the Nkore ("Banyankore") of south-western Uganda in the former province of Ankole, as well as in Tanzania, the DR Congo, Rwanda and Burundi.

Runyankole is mainly spoken in the Mbarara, Bushenyi, Ntungamo, Kiruhura, Ibanda, Isingiro, Rukungiri and parts of Kitagwenda districts.

There is a brief description and teaching guide for this language, written by Charles V. Taylor in the 1950s, and an adequate dictionary in print. Whilst this language is spoken by almost all the Ugandans in the region, most also speak English, especially in the towns. (English is one of Uganda's two official languages, and the language taught in schools.)

Nkore is so similar to Kiga (84–94 percent lexical similarity) that some argue they are dialects of the same language, a language called Nkore-Kiga by Taylor.

Phonology 
Runyankore has a five-vowel system:

 Sounds /i, u/ can be heard as [ɪ, ʊ] when short or lax.

Orthography
 a - [a]
 b - [b]
 c - [t͡ʃ]
 d - [d]
 e - [e]
 f - [f]
 g - [g/d͡ʒ]
 h - [h]
 i - [i]
 k - [k/t͡ʃ]
 m - [m]
 n - [n]
 o - [o]
 p - [p]
 r - [r]
 s - [s]
 t - [t]
 u - [u]
 v - [v]
 w - [w]
 y - [j]
 z - [z]
 ai - [ai̯]
 ei - [ɛi̯]
 gy - [gʲ]
 ky - [kʲ]
 mp - [ᵐp]
 mw - [ᵐw]
 nd - [ⁿd]
 ng - [ŋ]
 ny - [ɲ]
 oi - [ɔi̯]
 sh - [ʃ]
 ts - [t͡s]
 zh - [ʒ]

D and P are only used in the digraphs ND and MP and in loanwords.

G and K are [d͡ʒ] and [t͡ʃ] before I, [k] and [g] elsewhere.

Basic greetings

The greeting Agandi, implying, "How are you?" but literally meaning "other news!", can be replied with Ni marungi, which literally means "good news!".

The proper greetings are Oraire ota? or Osiibire ota?, literally translated "How was your night?" and "How was your day?".  "Good night" is Oraare gye and "Good day" is Osiibe gye.

Here are a few names one might use in a greeting:
Madam – Nyabo
Sir – Sebo
Child – omwana
Boy – omwojo
Girl – omwishiki

Food

Matooke or Bananas - Ebitookye
Maize Meal or corn bread – Obuhunga’Ensano’
Beans – Ebihimba
Meat – Enyama
Millet Bread – Oburo

Other words and phrases

No: Ngaaha (ing-gah-ha) or Apaana (ah-pah-nah)
Yes: Yego (yegg-oh)
Thank you: Yebare (Ye-ba-re)
Thank you very much: Yebare munonga (Ye-ba-re mu-non-ga)
You're welcome (literally: Thank you for appreciating): Yebare kusiima (ye-ba-re koo-see-mah) 
I like/love you: Ninkukunda (nin-koo-coon-dah) or ninkukunda munonga (nin-koo-coon-dah moo-non-gah)
My name is : Eizina ryangye niinye __ (ey-zeen-ah riya-gye ni-inye___) or ndi _ (in-dee __)
I am from _: Ninduga_ (nin-doog-ah_)
It's how much shillings/money? Ni shiringi zingahi? (Knee shi-rin-gee zin-gah-hee) or ni sente zingahi?
Good morning. How are you? 			
Oraire ota (orei-rota) Replies: I'm fine Ndaire gye (ndei-re-jeh) or Ndyaho (indi-aho)
Good morning. Did you sleep well?	
Oraire gye? (orei-reh-jeh)  
Reply:  Yes, yourself?
Yego, shan’iwe				
Good afternoon. How are you spending your day?		
Osiibire ota (o-see-bee-rota) 			 Replies: Nsiibire gye (insi-bi-reje)
You are spending your day well?
Osiibire gye (Osi birejge) Replies: Yes- Yego (yegg-oh) or nsiibire gye
Good afternoon. How has your day been? 	
Waasiiba ota (wasib-wota) Reply:  Fine, good, I've spent it well – Naasiiba gye  (nasi-baje)
Good night: oraregye

See also
 Runyakitara language

References 

a banyankore are bantu speaking group of people from South western Uganda and they speak Runyankore with (ntu) (aba) like akantu, ekintu, omuntu, abantu. Akantu means thing in prural, ekintu means something big, omuntu means a person, abantu means people same as in Zulu language of South Africa

Languages of Uganda
Nyoro-Ganda languages